Hagans Homestead, also known as Barnes Hotel and Stone Manor Tourist Home, is a historic home located at Brandonville, Preston County, West Virginia. It was built in 1830, and is a large -story, "L"-shaped house built of native cut sandstone. Also on the property is a Victorian gazebo, originally built as a well house. Built originally as a single-family dwelling, the Barnes family maintained the house as a hotel during the early 1900s, then later a tourist home in the 1940s and 1950s. It was divided into two apartments during the 1960s, then returned to a single-family home after 1970.

It was listed on the National Register of Historic Places in 1993.

References

Houses on the National Register of Historic Places in West Virginia
Houses completed in 1830
Houses in Preston County, West Virginia
National Register of Historic Places in Preston County, West Virginia
Stone houses in West Virginia
Greek Revival houses in West Virginia
Hotel buildings on the National Register of Historic Places in West Virginia
1830 establishments in Virginia